Kim Young-hwan (Korean: 김영환, born 27 May 1955) is a South Korean activist, writer, dentist and politician served as the Minister of Science and Technology from 2001 to 2002 under the President Kim Dae-jung.

He was also a long-term Member of the National Assembly in Ansan from 1996 to 2004 and 2009 to 2016. He stood for the Gyeonggi governorship in 2018 but lost.

Early life and career 
Kim was born in Goesan, North Chungcheong Province in 1955. After graduated from Cheongju High School in 1973, he studied dentistry at Yonsei University. In 1977, he was detained for 2 years due to lead a protest to abolish the Restoration Constitution. He was also involved in anti-dictatorship protests in 1980.

Kim also wrote several poems, including A Day of A Simple Assembler (단순 조립공의 하루) written under the pseudonym of Kim Hae-yoon (김해윤). Following his graduation in 1988, he opened a hospital.

Political career 
Kim Young-hwan was brought into the National Congress for New Politics in 1995 along with Kim Geun-tae whom he built a close relationship as a labourer. He ran in 1996 election and was elected. Following his re-election in 2000, he was appointed the Minister of Science and Technology in 2001. By the time of his appointment, he was the youngest person serving the position.

In 2003, when the Millennium Democratic Party (MDP) was split after the dissidents formed the new party named Uri Party, Kim remained at the MDP. He failed to be re-elected in 2004 election. Then, he returned as a dentist for a while. He launched a bid for Seoul mayorship in 2006 but his party chose Park Joo-sun instead. He harshly criticised the party's decision and warned he could leave the party.

Kim returned to the National Assembly following his election in 2009 by-election. In 2012, he announced his bid to run as the President of the Republic but lost at the preselection.

In 2016, Kim joined the People's Party formed by Ahn Cheol-soo. He stood again as an MP candidate in 2016 election but lost to Kim Cheol-min. Shortly after that, he was appointed the Secretary-General of his party. He resigned on 10 November due to the disagreement with the party's decision to join outdoor rallies against the President of the Republic Park Geun-hye involved in political scandal. In January 2017, he ran as the party presidency but lost to Park Jie-won; instead, he was elected as one of the Vice Presidents.

Prior to the local elections in 2018, Kim was selected as the Bareunmirae candidate for Gyeonggi governorship. He harshly condemned the Democratic candidate Lee Jae-myung connected to various controversies, but ended up with 4.8%, coming behind to Lee Jae-myung and Nam Kyung-pil. He ran for the party presidency on 2 September but lost.

In February 2020, Kim joined the United Future Party and was elected as one of the Vice Presidents.

Personal life 
Kim married to Chun Eun-joo in 1985, who is a cousin to Yang Hyun-suk, the former Chief Executive Officer of YG Entertainment. Both has a son and two daughters.

Works

Poems 
 Come Here, Poem
 Dreams of Past Days Pushing Me
 Flower and Destiny
 My Father Eating Poops
 Is Human Fart Flammable?
 Mother of Burning Baghdad
 We Drank Love in Murwang-ri
 Dear Stone Coffin, Please Wash Your Rake Hands in the Flowing River
 Dazzling Loneliness

Essays 
 Love Song for You
 You Who Stood Alone Is Beautiful
 The First "Challenge!"
 10 Thoughts Storage Saving The Country
 Ambiocularity CV

Critiques 
 The Politics of Plus and Minus

Election results

General elections

Local elections

Governor of Gyeonggi

References

External links 
 Kim Young-hwan on Twitter
 Kim Young-hwan on Facebook
 Kim Young-hwan on Blog

1955 births
Living people
Governors of North Chungcheong Province
Yonsei University alumni
South Korean dentists
People Power Party (South Korea) politicians